The Roman Catholic Diocese of Cajazeiras is a diocese located in the city of Cajazeiras in the Ecclesiastical province of Paraíba in Brazil.

History
6 February 1914: Established as Diocese of Cajazeiras from the Diocese of Paraíba

Bishops
Bishops of Cajazeiras (Roman rite), in reverse chronological order
Bishop Francisco de Sales Alencar Batista, O. Carm. (September 14, 2016 – present)
Bishop José Gonzalez Alonso (20 June 2001 – 16 September 2015)
Bishop Matias Patrício de Macêdo (12 July 1990  - 12 July 2000), appointed Coadjutor Bishop of Campina Grande, Paraiba; future Archbishop
Bishop Zacarias Rolim de Moura (27 April 1953 – 12 July 1990)
Bishop Luis do Amaral Mousinho (30 August 1948 – 18 March 1952), appointed Bishop of Ribeirão Preto; future Archbishop 
Bishop Henrique Gelain (29 July 1944 – 22 May 1948), appointed Bishop of Cafelândia
Bishop José da Matha de Andrade y Amaral (24 March 1934 – 12 May 1941), appointed Bishop of Amazonas
Bishop Moisés Ferreira Coelho (later Archbishop) (16 November 1914 – 12 February 1932), appointed Coadjutor Archbishop of Paraíba

References

GCatholic.org
Catholic Hierarchy
Diocese website (Portuguese)

Roman Catholic dioceses in Brazil
Cajazeiras, Roman Catholic Diocese of
Roman Catholic dioceses and prelatures established in the 20th century
Christian organizations established in 1914